Hopewell (also, Gregory) is an unincorporated community in Gibson County, Tennessee, United States. It lies at an elevation of 338 feet (103 m).

References

Unincorporated communities in Gibson County, Tennessee
Unincorporated communities in Tennessee